Running Out of Skin is an EP by Pyrrhon, released independently on March 15, 2016.

Track listing

Personnel
Adapted from the Running Out of Skin liner notes.

Pyrrhon''
 Alex Cohen – drums, recording
 Dylan DiLella – electric guitar
 Erik Malave – bass guitar, backing vocals
 Doug Moore – lead vocalsProduction and design'''
 Caroline Harrison – cover art, design
 Colin Marston – mixing, mastering

Release history

References

External links 
 Running Out of Skin at Discogs (list of releases)
 Running Out of Skin at Bandcamp

2016 EPs
Pyrrhon (band) albums